Taj al-Din may refer to:

Politicians and religious leaders
Cheraman Perumal Tajuddin (7th century)- First Hindu to convert to Islam and possibly only companion of the Prophet Muhammad from India
Al-Shahrastani or in full Taj al-Din Abu al-Fath Muhammad ibn 'Abd al-Karim al-Shahrastani, (1086–1153), Persian historian of religion
Tajuddin Yildoz (fl. 1210), ruler of Ghazni
Taj Al-Din Ebrahim ibn Rushan Amir Al-Kordi Al-Sanjani, entitled Zahed Gilani (1216–1301), Grandmaster of the Zahediyeh Sufi order
Tajuddin Chishti (13th century), Sufi saint of the Chishti Order
Taj al-Din ibn Qutb al-Din, (died 1351), Mihrabanid king of Sistan
Taj al-Din Shah-i Shahan Abu'l Fath, (c. 1349–1403), Mihrabanid king of Sistan
Shah Tajuddin, Bangladeshi Sufi saint
Sultan Ahmad Tajuddin Halim Shah I (reigned 1706–1709), Sultan of Kedah
Sultan Ahmad Tajuddin Halim Shah II (reigned 1797–1843), Sultan of Kedah
Sultan Ahmad Tajuddin Mukarram Shah (1854–1879), Sultan of Kedah
Tajuddin Muhammad Badruddin (1861–1925), also called Hazrat Tajuddin Baba, Indian Muslim Sufi master
Taj al-Din al-Hasani (1885–1943), Syrian politician
Ahmad Tajuddin (1913–1950), sultan of Brunei
Tajuddin Ahmad (1925–1975), first Prime Minister of Bangladesh
Tadjidine Ben Said Massounde (1933–2004), Comorian politician
Taj El-Din Hilaly (born c. 1941), Australian Sunni Muslim imam
Talgat Tadzhuddin (born 1948), Chief Mufti of Russia
Tajudeen Abdul-Raheem (1961–2009), Nigerian politician
Master Taj-ud-Din Ansari, Pakistani politician
Tajaddin Mehdiyev, Azerbaijani military politician
Tajuddin Abdul Rahman, Malaysian politician

Sportsmen
Ibrahim Taaj Al Din, (born 1981), Nigerian footballer
Sami Tajeddine (or Tajeddine Sami), (born 1982), Moroccan footballer
Tajiddin M. Smith-Wilson, or Taj Smith, (born 1983), American footballer
Tengku Ahmad Tajuddin (born 1986), Malaysian field hockey player
Amirizwan Taj Tajuddin  (born 1986), Malaysian footballer
Ak Hafiy Tajuddin Rositi (born 1991), Bruneian runner

Places
Taj od Din, Mazandaran, village in Sari County, Mazandaran Province, Iran
Taj ol Din, Razavi Khorasan, village in Dargaz County, Razavi Khorasan Province, Iran
Talkhab-e Taj od Din, village in Masjed Soleyman County, Khuzestan Province, Iran
Abdoltajj od Din, village in Kangavar County, Kermanshah Province, Iran
Taj ol Din, West Azerbaijan, village in West Azerbaijan Province, Iran

Institutions
Kazi Tajuddeen ITI, Industrial Training Institute in Tamil Nadu

See also
Tajaddini, Persian surname
Taj (disambiguation)